Jake Vokins (born 17 March 2000) is an English professional footballer who plays as a left-back for Premier League club Southampton.

Club career

Southampton
On 19 September 2018, Vokins signed a professional contract with Southampton. He made his professional debut for Southampton, coming on as a substitute in the dying seconds of a 3–1 EFL Cup loss to Manchester City, on 29 October 2019.

Vokins made his first professional start for Southampton in a 2–0 FA Cup victory over Huddersfield Town on 4 January 2020, scoring the second goal. On 16 July 2020, he made his first Premier League appearance in a 1–1 draw against Brighton. On 4 August 2020, Vokins signed a new four-year deal with the club.

He made his first appearance for Southampton in the 2020–21 season in a 2–0 FA Cup victory against Shrewsbury Town. A week later, Vokins made his first Premier League start of the season in Southampton's 3–1 defeat to Arsenal.

Sunderland (loan) 
On 29 January 2021, he joined League One side Sunderland on loan until the end of the season. He was cup-tied for Sunderland's victory in the 2021 EFL Trophy Final. Vokins tested positive for COVID-19 during his spell with Sunderland, and an ECD discovered that he had a slight heart flicker. Vokins did not make another appearance for Sunderland afterwards.

Ross County (loan) 
On 2 July 2021, Vokins joined Ross County on loan for the 2021–22 season. On 21 July 2021, Vokins made his first appearance for Ross County in a 1–0 victory over Brora Rangers in the Scottish League Cup and assisted the only goal of the game. On 1 August 2021, Ross County manager Malkay Mackay revealed that Vokins had suffered a stress fracture on his fifth metatarsal and had to have an operation back at Southampton.

Woking (loan) 
On 1 September 2022, Vokins joined Woking on a season-long loan. On 12 January 2023, he was recalled by Southampton.

International career
Vokins was a member of the England under-17 team that finished runners up at the 2017 UEFA European Under-17 Championship and was a second-half substitute in the final against Spain.

Career statistics

Honours
England U17 
UEFA European Under-17 Championship runner-up: 2017

References

External links
 
 
 Southampton FC Profile

2000 births
Living people
Footballers from Oxford
English footballers
England youth international footballers
Southampton F.C. players
Sunderland A.F.C. players
Ross County F.C. players
Woking F.C. players
Association football fullbacks
Premier League players
Scottish Professional Football League players